Sarah Paw Si Ying (born 8 March 1992) is a former Singaporean competitive figure skater. In 2007, she emerged as the winner of Singapore National Figure Skating Championships in the novice ladies' category.

References 

1992 births
Living people
Singaporean female single skaters
Sportspeople from Beijing
Singaporean sportspeople of Chinese descent